Nuna7 is a solar-powered racing car in the Nuna series built by the Dutch Nuon Solar Team. The team finished first with Nuna7 at the World Solar Challenge 2013, a race of 3000 km through the outback of Australia. The Nuon Solar Team consisted of 16 students of Delft University of Technology.

World Solar Challenge 2013 - New regulations
The 2013 regulations had some major changes. All vehicles had to be designed with four wheels, and the driver compartment had to comply with new demands on safety. All teams had to rethink the design of their cars, Nuna7 was built as an asymmetric vehicle

Specifications Nuna 7

See also
 Nuna main article about the Nuna series of Dutch solar cars
 Solar car racing
 List of solar car teams

External links 
 Nuna's

Solar car racing
Delft University of Technology
Science and technology in the Netherlands
Dutch inventions